The Mahé-class minesweeper is a class of mid-1960s small Russian minesweepers designed to counter the threat posed by naval mines. Minesweepers generally detect then neutralize mines in advance of other naval operations.

The Mahé class was designed with glass-reinforced plastic hulls built at Kolpino, USSR. All of the vessels were based at Kochi and undertook various operational commitments such as mine counter-measure exercises, harbour defence, visits to various minor ports, and search and rescue missions.

Units

References

Mine warfare vessel classes